The Pasarlapudi blowout  was an oil rig blowout that took place on 6.50 pm, 8 January 1995 in Pasarlapudi, near Amalapuram in the East Godavari district of Andhra Pradesh, India. It was the largest blowout ever recorded in the history of the India's oil and natural gas exploration with a fire that engulfed drilling site number 19, rig number E 1400-18GF. The fire continued for 65 days. Initially Neil Adams Fire Fighters(NAF, Houston) was hired to bring fire under control. After ONGC disagreed with their strategy NAF left and it was finally brought under control on 15 March 1995 by International Well Control. The blowout did not cause any casualties, but the drilling rig was destroyed. Damages to the drilling rig were estimated at Rs 9.2 crore crore as well as about Rs 7 crore of damage to equipment at the well site area.

Evacuation
7 villages within the 2 kilometers radius of the rig, approximately 1,500 people were evacuated immediately by APSRTC buses. More people fled in panic from the nearby villages.

See also 
 Oil well fire
 Konaseema
 Amalapuram

References

1995 in the environment
History of Andhra Pradesh (1947–2014)
Disasters in Andhra Pradesh
Explosions in India
East Godavari district
1995 industrial disasters
Environmental disasters in India
Oil and Natural Gas Corporation
January 1995 events in Asia